Hopea montana is a species of plant in the family Dipterocarpaceae. It is found in Sumatra, Peninsular Malaysia and Borneo.

The Latin specific epithet montana refers to mountains or coming from mountains.

References

montana
Trees of Sumatra
Trees of Peninsular Malaysia
Trees of Borneo
Critically endangered flora of Asia
Taxonomy articles created by Polbot